Nitratireductor lucknowense is a bacterium from the genus of Nitratireductor which was isolated from pesticide contaminated soil in Lucknow in India.

References

Phyllobacteriaceae
Bacteria described in 2012